Radosław Piwowarski (born 20 February 1948, Bielsko-Biała) is a Polish film director, screenwriter and actor.

Life and career
He was born on 20 February 1948 in Olszówka Dolna, a district of Bielsko-Biała in southern Poland. In 1971, he graduated from the National Film School in Łódź. Between 1972-1981, he was a member of the Zespół Filmowy „X” film studio headed by renowned filmmaker Andrzej Wajda. Since 1998 until 2003, he served as director of the TVP1 Channel. He is a member of the Polish Film Academy.

His 1985 film Yesterday was awarded the Golden Shell at the San Sebastián International Film Festival, Golden Tulip at the International Istanbul Film Festival and was selected as the Polish entry for the Best Foreign Language Film at the 58th Academy Awards, but was not accepted as a nominee. In 1993, his film Kolejność uczuć won Golden Lions at the 18th Gdynia Film Festival.

Personal life
He is the son of painter Monika Piwowarska and sculptor Edward Piwowarski. He has two sons Kordian and Cyprian.

Filmography
Hotel 52, TV series, season 6 and 7 (2012-2013)
Szpilki na Giewoncie, TV series, season 4 (2012)
Kopciuszek, TV series (2006-2007) 
Na dobre i na złe, TV series (2005-2008)
Stacyjka (2004) 
Królowa chmur w Święta polskie (2003) 
Lokatorzy, TV series (2002-2005) 
Palce lizać (1999)
Złotopolscy, TV series (1997-2010) 
Ciemna strona Wenus (1997)
Autoportret z kochanką (1996)
Kolejność uczuć (1993)
Aby do świtu... (1992)
Marcowe migdały (1989)
Pociąg do Hollywood (1987)
Kochankowie mojej mamy (1985)
Yesterday (1984)
Jan Serce (1981)
Córka albo syn (1979)
Ciuciubabka (1977)
CDN (1975)

References

1948 births
Living people
Polish film directors
Polish screenwriters
People from Bielsko-Biała
Łódź Film School alumni